Dilling may refer to:

Dilling people, an ethnic group of Sudan
Dilling language, language spoken by the Dilling people, part of the Nubian branch of the Nilo-Saharan family
Dalang, Sudan, a city in Sudan
Dilling, a village in Østfold, Norway

People with the surname Dilling include:
Walter James Dilling (1886–1950), Scottish pharmacologist
Elizabeth Dilling (1894–1966), American activist and writer in the 1930s and 1940s
Jim Dilling (born 1985), American high jumper

See also
Dill (disambiguation)